Joyce Craig  is an American politician serving as the mayor of Manchester, New Hampshire. She is the first female mayor of the city, having been elected in 2017.

Biography

Early elected career
Craig's first political campaign came in 2007, when she was elected to the Manchester School Board. In 2009, she was elected to the Board of Mayor and Aldermen, where she represented Ward 1 from January 3, 2010 – January 3, 2016, until her first campaign for mayor in 2015, which she narrowly lost. Craig finished second in the nonpartisan blanket primary, thus advancing to face incumbent Mayor Ted Gatsas in the general election, where she lost in a recount by 64 votes.

In 2017, Craig again challenged Gatsas, this time finishing first in the nonpartisan blanket primary and defeating Gatsas in the general election 53% to 46%. In doing so, Craig became the first woman ever elected as Mayor of Manchester.

Mayoralty
Craig was sworn in as the 56th Mayor of Manchester on January 5, 2018, promising in her inauguration to focus on improving school quality, combating the opioid epidemic, and promoting the creation of high-tech jobs in the city. On March 16, 2023, Craig announced that she will not seek a fourth term as mayor. Her third term being Mayor of Manchester will then end after the 2023 municipal elections in November.

Family
Joyce and her husband, Attorney Michael Craig, have three children, William, Sarah and Kathryn.

References

Living people
21st-century American politicians
21st-century American women politicians
Mayors of Manchester, New Hampshire
New Hampshire Democrats
People from Manchester, New Hampshire
University of New Hampshire alumni
Women mayors of places in New Hampshire
Year of birth missing (living people)